The tule elk (Cervus canadensis nannodes) is a subspecies of elk found only in California, ranging from the grasslands and marshlands of the Central Valley to the grassy hills on the coast. The subspecies name derives from the tule, a species of sedge native to freshwater marshes on which the Tule elk feeds. When the Europeans first arrived, an estimated 500,000 tule elk roamed these regions, but by 1870 they were thought to be extirpated. However, in 1874–1875 a single breeding pair was discovered in the tule marshes of Buena Vista Lake in the southern San Joaquin Valley. Conservation measures were taken to protect the species in the 1970s. Today, the wild population exceeds 4,000. Tule elk can reliably be found in Carrizo Plain National Monument, Point Reyes National Seashore, portions of the Owens Valley from Lone Pine to Bishop, on Coyote Ridge in Santa Clara Valley, San Jose, California and in Pacheco State Park and areas surrounding San Luis Reservoir near Los Banos, California.

Description
Considered the smallest of the elk subspecies in North America, the tule elk were the dominant large ungulate in California prior to the arrival of the Spanish. Although tule elk have been reported as half the size of the Roosevelt elk (C. c. roosevelti), and sometimes referred to as the dwarf elk, this moniker may be misleading as the smaller size of some tule elk may reflect poor nutrition of elk subsisting on marginal habitat such as the Owens River watershed. Wildlife biologist Dale McCullough described an elk transplanted from Buttonwillow in the San Joaquin Valley to a golf course in Monterey that grew to the size of a Rocky Mountain elk. Also hunter H. C. Banta described the tule elk in the 1850s as "I found no difference in size between these elk and the Oregon, Washington, Wyoming and Colorado elk, and felt sure that the bulls would weight 700 to 800 pounds".

The calves are similar to deer fawns, with brown coats and white spots.

Genetic studies based on mitochondrial and nuclear DNA confirm that tule elk, Roosevelt elk and Rocky Mountain elk should be considered distinct subspecies. A 2007 nuclear DNA microsatellite study found single alleles at many loci, with a maximum of five alleles at one locus, indicating that there has either been a mutation at this locus subsequent to the single breeding pair reported by Henry Miller and nineteenth century game warden A. C. Tibbet, or there were three surviving tule elk at the 1800's genetic bottleneck. Another microsatellite study in 2016 found no more than four alleles at any locus, consistent with tule elk having been reduced to a single breeding pair.

History
The first European explorer to see tule elk was likely Sir Francis Drake who landed in July 1579 probably in today's Drake's Bay, Marin County, California: "The inland we found to be far different from the shoare, a goodly country and fruitful soil, stored with many blessings fit for the use of man: infinite was the company of very large and fat deer, which there we saw by thousands as we supposed in a herd..." A more definitive second encounter 16 years later was described by Sebastian Rodriguez Cermeño, who was shipwrecked in December 1595, and in Drake's Bay with certainty. Cermeño's account described "deer walking about, the largest ever found, as could be seen by the antlers, of which the Captain carried away a sample". On a trip inland they found "a great quantity of deer horns, one of which, measured before this witness, showed sixteen palmas [11 feet] from point to point." Cermeno and his crew made a small boat from their wrecked Manila galleon and sailed back to Acapulco, Mexico with but a single trophy of their voyage to the Philippines, the set of large elk antlers. Next, Sebastián Vizcaíno described seeing elk on his December 1602 exploration of the Monterey area, "Among the animals there are large, fierce bears, and other animals called elks, from which they make elk leather jackets." When Richard Henry Dana Jr. visited San Francisco Bay in 1835, he wrote about vast elk herds near the Golden Gate on December 27: "...we came to anchor near the mouth of the bay, under a high and beautifully sloping hill, upon which herds of hundreds and hundreds of red deer [note: "red deer" is the European term for "elk"], and the stag, with his high branching antlers, were bounding about...", although it is not clear whether this was the Marin side or the San Francisco side.

The arrival of the Spanish in the late 18th century introduced cattle and horses to the grasslands of the Central Valley, competing with the native elk. Unrestricted hunting further reduced the herds. By the time elk hunting was banned by the State Legislature in 1873, the tule elk was believed to be extinct.

California cattle baron Henry Miller protected tule elk after a pair was discovered on his ranch in the tule marshes near Buena Vista Lake by game warden A. C. Tibbett in 1874. Miller ordered his men to protect the elk and is credited for the survival of the subspecies. After his death, the huge Miller-Lux ranch was subdivided and the hunting of the elk resumed. The population was reduced to 72 head. By 1895, habitat loss and poaching had reduced the elk population to only 28. In the years that followed, the elk were transplanted 21 times, with each attempt failing to establish free-ranging herds.

In 1933, rancher Walter Dow took a small group of penned elk from Yosemite to his ranch in Owens Valley, east of the Sierra Nevada. Although not native habitat for the elk, they thrived. In the same year, the state put a small herd at Cache Creek. This herd has not fared well due to poor range conditions. This herd may have interbred with the Rocky Mountain elk which were introduced near Mount Shasta.

In 1960, the state held a hearing in Owens Valley to determine how many elk should be allowed to live there. They decided the elk should be hunted to limit their numbers to under 500 animals. Through efforts of the California Department of Fish and Game, three permanent elk herds were established in California. By 1969, the Tupman State Reserve (32), Cache Creek (80) and Owens Valley, Inyo County (300 elk) were in place.

A private citizen from Los Angeles, Beula Edmiston, formed a group to attempt a preservation program for the elk. After more than 10 years of lobbying both on the federal and state levels, in 1971, California passed legislation (the Behr bill) requiring the elk may not be hunted until their numbers surpass 2,000 head statewide or until it could be determined that suitable elk habitat no longer existed in the state, and mandated the California Department of Resources to reintroduce the elk into former habitats wherever possible.

In 1976, the US Congress passed a resolution which stated 2000 tule elk is an appropriate national goal, and directed federal agencies to make federal lands available for preservation of tule elk. An Interagency Task Force of representatives from the National Park Service, US Forest Service, the Armed Forces, Bureau of Land Management, California Department of Parks and Recreation, and the California Department of Fish and Game selected sites for the reintroduction of tule elk within the state. A herd was established at the San Luis Wildlife Refuge in 1974, and elk were released at the Concord Naval Weapons Station in 1977. In 1978, herds were established at Mount Hamilton in Santa Clara County, Lake Pillsbury in Lake County, Jawbone Canyon in Kern County, Point Reyes National Seashore, Fort Hunter Liggett Military Reservation, and Camp Roberts.

Historic range and current population

McCullough identified nineteenth century tule elk antler specimens collected in three separate locations north of the San Francisco Bay: Sonoma in Sonoma County, as well as San Geronimo  and  Tomales both in Marin County.

By 1986 numbers had increased to over 2,000 individuals distributed among 22 populations throughout California, largely due to successful reintroduction programs. By 1998, California's tule elk population exceeded 3,200. In 2007, the statewide population was estimated at 3,800. A 2014 report placed the statewide population at 4,200 in 22 herds. As of 2019, the total Californian population was estimated to be 5,700.

Small numbers of tule elk in Point Reyes have tested positive for Mycobacterium avium subspecies paratuberculosis or "MAP", a wasting disease known as Johne's Disease. The bacteria was apparently transmitted by dairy cattle or spraying of cattle manure on pasturelands. In 2016 more tule elk tested positive after being euthanized so that their gut tissue could be analyzed. Cattle transmitted the disease to the Tomales Point elk herd shortly after they were first established there in 1978.

Diet and impact on native grasslands

Two male and eight female elk were translocated from Merced County, California to Tomales Point on Point Reyes National Seashore in March 1978. The elk showed signs of nutritional stress including copper deficiency and antler anomalies by summer 1979 and two elk died. One explanation was molybdenum which expresses as copper deficiency.  A former molybdenum mine existed in that area of the Point Reyes National Seashore.  Other possible explanations include failure to remove cattle until 1979 and the fact that 1977 and 1978 were drought years. Birth rates remained negligible until 1981, when they began reproducing at predicted maximum rates. Studies of fecal material documented that the tule elk preferred grasses and forbs with little use of shrubs such as willow. These results are consistent with findings on the Diablo Range, Santa Clara County elk herd where more than 50% of the tule elk diet were grasses.

A 2007 study at the Tomales Point Elk Reserve showed that tule elk appear to play a critical role in preventing succession of open grasslands to less diverse, shrub-dominated ecosystems. Elk grazing had a positive impact on native grassland species abundance and diversity, and seemed to increase the richness and abundance of some exotic taxa while reducing Holcus lanatus — a highly invasive exotic grass which is a major problem in mesic perennial grasslands.

See also
Elk
Red deer
Rocky Mountain elk
Roosevelt elk

References

Further reading

 Changes in Interactions Among Tule Elk Bulls Cervus elaphus nannodes. Joseph Muriuki Wahome, Thesis, University of California, Berkeley, 1995. 330 pages
 The Return of the Tule Elk-Verna R. Johnston-Pacific Discovery, Vol. 31, Number 1, pages 14–25, Jan–Feb, 1978 California Academy of Sciences, San Francisco
 The Tule Elk Preservation Act of 1976-Public Law 94-389
 Tule Elk Management Plan and Environmental Assessment, Oct. 1997
 History of the California Tule Elk, Gerhard Bakker, Los Angeles City College, 1961
 Tule Elk in California, History, Current Status, and Management Recommendations, Gene Scott Fowler, UC Berkeley, July 1985
 Acclimation of Reintroduced Tule Elk in the Diablo Range, California,  Julie A.Phillips,  Thesis, San Jose State University, May 1985

External links

 Video on Pt. Reyes and Mt. Hamilton Elk: Elk Return to the Bay Area by KQED: QUEST Northern California 
 Tule Elk at Point Reyes National Seashore
 Tule Elk State Natural Reserve
 Tule Elk History in the Owens Valley
 North Coyote Ridge (Santa Clara County) Elk Herd filmed by Michael Hundt 2017
 ESCI 90: Santa Clara County Field Studies: Tule Elk

Elk and red deer
Endemic fauna of California
Fauna of the San Francisco Bay Area
Taxa named by Clinton Hart Merriam